Yunus Dimoara Musah (born November 29, 2002) is an American professional soccer player who plays as a midfielder for La Liga club Valencia and the United States national team.

Born in the United States to Ghanaian parents, he grew up mostly in Italy and England. He was a youth international for England before committing to the United States in 2021.

Club career

Early career
Musah was born in New York City while his Ghanaian mother was on vacation in the United States. His father is also Ghanaian. He moved to Italy after his birth, living in Castelfranco Veneto and later starting his career at Giorgione Calcio 2000. In 2012, at age nine, he moved to London and joined Arsenal's Academy. Arsenal U16 coach Trevor Bumstead stated Musah made an immediate impression; "As a player, he was ‘wow’. He’s got fantastic physical attributes and the drive and determination to go with that. He would play anywhere to get in the team but his favourite was as a central attacking midfield player."

Valencia
In the summer of 2019, Musah joined Valencia, at the age of 16, and was assigned to the reserves in Segunda División B. He made his debut with the B-team at the age of 16 on September 15, 2019, starting in a 0–0 home draw against CF La Nucía. He scored his first senior goal on March 1, 2020, netting his team's only goal in a 2–1 loss at Gimnàstic de Tarragona.

After the arrival of new manager Javi Gracia in Valencia's first team, Musah spent the 2020 pre-season with the main squad. At age 17 years and eight months, he made his first team—and La Liga—debut on September 13 of that year, starting in a 4–2 home win against Levante UD. In doing so, he became the first Englishman and American to debut for the club.

On November 1, 2020, aged 17 years and 338 days, Musah scored a goal in a 2–2 draw against Getafe CF, becoming the youngest non-Spanish player to score for Valencia, breaking the previous record held by Lee Kang-in, aged 18 years and 219 days. The following month, he extended his contract with Valencia until 2026. On December 16, in the first round of the Copa del Rey, he came on with four minutes remaining away to Tercera División club Terrassa FC and scored an equalizing goal as his team won 4–2 after extra time.

In the 2021–22 Copa del Rey, Musah scored in wins at CD Utrillas and CD Arenteiro in the early rounds. In the final on April 23, he replaced Dimitri Foulquier after 100 minutes of a 1–1 draw against Real Betis and was the only player to miss in the penalty shootout.

International career
As a youth, Musah was eligible to play for the United States, Ghana, Italy, and England.

England youth teams
Musah made his international debut with England's under-15s in 2016 and subsequently represented England up to the under-18 level. He was also called up to the under-19 squad in October 2020. A Musah penalty earned England's under-18s a draw against Brazil's under-17s on September 8, 2019, and he went on to score a crucial goal against Austria's under-18s on October 16, 2019, with England winning 3–2. In total, Musah played more than 30 times for England at youth level.

U.S. men’s team
Musah accepted a call-up to the United States senior squad on November 2, 2020, to play in friendlies against Wales and Panama later that month. He was part of a largely Europe-based squad which included 10 first-time selections and had an average age of 22. Musah had been contacted by the United States Soccer Federation through Nico Estévez, a United States assistant manager who had connections with Valencia CF having previously managed their youth and reserve teams for eight years. Musah made his senior international debut on November 11, starting in a 0–0 draw against Wales at the Liberty Stadium in Swansea. He then started the following 6–2 win over Panama on November 16.

Despite Musah having played for the United States at senior level, England senior manager Gareth Southgate attempted to persuade Musah to play for England, stating: "We're monitoring him. He's been with us in the last couple of months and we'd very much like his future to be with us." England under-21 manager Aidy Boothroyd also stated: "I am hopeful we will see him in the U21s at some point. I don’t know [if he has made his decision]. I hope he hasn’t because I think if he came here and saw what we are all about that he would really enjoy it." Meanwhile, United States management continued to connect with Musah after the November USMNT camp, with assistant manager Nico Estévez in day-to-day contact and also manager Gregg Berhalter holding conversations with Musah and his family.

In late 2020, as he approached his 18th birthday, Musah was reportedly undecided on the question of which nation to represent permanently. On March 15, 2021, however, he officially committed to represent the United States internationally. Musah played for the U.S. at the 2022 World Cup in Qatar, being eliminated in the round of 16 against the Netherlands.

Career statistics

Club

International

Honors
United States
CONCACAF Nations League: 2019–20
Individual

 U.S. Soccer Young Male Athlete of the Year: 2022

References

External links
Profile at the Valencia CF website

2002 births
Living people
Soccer players from New York City
American soccer players
United States men's international soccer players
English footballers
England youth international footballers
Italian footballers
American emigrants to England
American emigrants to Italy
American sportspeople of Ghanaian descent
Naturalised citizens of the United Kingdom
Italian people of Ghanaian descent
Italian sportspeople of African descent
English sportspeople of Ghanaian descent
African-American soccer players
Black British sportspeople
Association football midfielders
La Liga players
Segunda División B players
Valencia CF Mestalla footballers
Valencia CF players
2022 FIFA World Cup players
American expatriate soccer players
English expatriate footballers
American expatriate sportspeople in Spain
English expatriate sportspeople in Spain
Expatriate footballers in Spain
21st-century African-American sportspeople